Qaleh-ye Shir Khan (also Romanized as Qal‘eh-ye Shīr Khān and Qal‘eh Shīr Khān) is a village in Qareh Chay Rural District, in the Central District of Saveh County, Markazi Province, Iran. At the 2006 census, its population was 438, in 85 families.

References 

Populated places in Saveh County